Ayşe Taş (born February 19, 1987) is a Turkish female boxer competing in the Bantamweight (54 kg) division. She is a member of the Fenerbahçe Boxing team.

As of December 1, 2010, Ayşe Taş ranked second in her weight category at the "World Women's Rankings" list.

Achievements
 2007 Women's European Union Amateur Boxing Championships Lille, France 52 kg - 
 2010 Women's European Union Amateur Boxing Championships Keszthely, Hungary 54 kg - 
 2011 Women's European Union Amateur Boxing Championships Katowice, Poland 54 kg - 
 2011 Rotterdam, Netherlands 54 kg -

References

Turkish women boxers
Fenerbahçe boxers
Living people
1987 births
Bantamweight boxers
European Games competitors for Turkey
Boxers at the 2015 European Games 
AIBA Women's World Boxing Championships medalists